Babbler may refer to:

 Old World babbler, a large family of mostly Old World passerine birds
 Australo-Papuan babbler, passerine birds endemic to Australia-New Guinea
 Babbler (software), a French software company
 Babbler (Dungeons & Dragons), a fictional monster
 Vic Babbler,  the newsletter of Birds Australia - Victoria